The Glasgow–Edinburgh via Falkirk line is a mainline railway line linking Glasgow and Edinburgh via Falkirk in Scotland. A typical service calls at Glasgow Queen Street, Croy, Falkirk High, Haymarket and Edinburgh or Glasgow Queen Street, Falkirk High, Polmont, Linlithgow, Haymarket and Edinburgh.

History 

The route has historic significance as it was Scotland's first inter-city railway, opening on 2 February 1842 as the Edinburgh and Glasgow Railway. It later became a key constituent of the North British Railway.

Electrification 
The line was electrified in the 2010s. It was anticipated that electric Class 380 trains would start running from May 2017, followed by new Class 385 trains from September 2017. However, delays to the electrification project mean the 380s did not run until December 2017 and the 385s did not run until July 2018.

Places served 
The route serves the following places (Ordnance Survey grid references for stations):

Services

Passenger services are operated by ScotRail. The line is electrified. The "(Glasgow Queen Street-Edinburgh Haymarket) Shuttle" weekday day time service pattern sees a train every 15 minutes from Glasgow/Edinburgh. All trains stop at Falkirk High and Haymarket, with selected trains stopping at Croy, Polmont and Linlithgow.

The Sunday service sees a train every 30 minutes from Glasgow/Edinburgh with all trains calling at Falkirk High and Haymarket and a train every hour at Croy, Polmont and Linlithgow. However, both Linlithgow and Polmont also benefit from the Edinburgh–Dunblane line every half hour on a Sunday.

Rolling stock

1950s/60s 
As part of a review by the British Transport Commission report in 1952, the services were provided by the 1956 batch of Class 126 DMU, entering service in 1957.

1970s 
In 1971, the stock provided changed to locomotives fitted for Blue Star multiple working. Initially a mixture of Class 25, Class 27 and Class 37 at each end of a rake of Mark 2 carriages through wired and piped to provide  "push-pull" working. This very quickly settled down to a dedicated pool of Class 27 locomotives.

1980s 
In 1980, the push-pull sets were replaced by single Class 47/7s at one end of a rake of Mark 3 carriages and a DBSO operating with TDM system. Also during this period, InterCity provided through services from Glasgow Queen Street to London King's Cross and various West Country destinations, resulting in the use of InterCity 125s on the route.

At this time, the service operated on a half-hourly frequency with all trains stopping at Haymarket and Falkirk High, with alternate trains stopping at Polmont and Linlithgow. Some peak hour trains stopped at Bishopbriggs, Lenzie and Croy. Sunday trains served .

In 1984 the Polmont rail accident, where a train hit a cow on the track (part of the cow's leg was trapped in the bogie of the train, lifting it off the track) resulted in 13 deaths and 61 injuries. It led to a debate about the safety of push-pull trains.

In the late 1980s with the electrification of the Great Eastern Main Line by British Rail, the DBSO set-up was planned for replacement with Class 158 in four and six car formations, however due to delays in deliveries and the need to release the stock for the Great Eastern Main Line, Class 156 were used for a short period, prior to being put into use on the Far North Line.

1990s/2000s 
Delivery of the Class 170s since 1999 has displaced the Class 158s for other duties, including the Far North Line. Other motive power can be seen as a result of operational considerations including Classes 156 and 158.

Present day 
Since electrification of the line in 2017, services have been operated by s from July 2018. Since October 2018  HSTs have been introduced on long-distance services that use parts of the route.

References

Sources

Other articles 
 Glasgow to Edinburgh Lines
 Edinburgh and Glasgow Railway

Railway lines in Scotland
Standard gauge railways in Scotland
1842 establishments in Scotland
1842 in rail transport
Transport in Glasgow
Transport in East Dunbartonshire
Transport in Falkirk (council area)
Transport in West Lothian
Transport in Edinburgh